The 2014 Dhaka Senior Division League started on 12 September 2014 where 7 clubs competed with each other. This was the leagues 57th season and fourth as Bangladesh's third-tier.

2014 league teams
The following 7 clubs competed in the Dhaka Senior Division League during the 2014 season.
 Bangladesh Boys Club
 Basabo Tarun Sangho
 Dhaka Wanderers Club
 Dhaka United SC
 Fakirerpool Young Men's Club
 Friends SWO
 Jatrabari KC
 Mohakhali XI
 Swadhinata KS
 T&T Club

The venues for this season
 Bangabandhu National Stadium, Dhaka
 Bir Sherestha Shaheed Shipahi Mostafa Kamal Stadium, Dhaka
 Paltan Play Ground
 BUET Play Ground

References

2014
3
Bangladesh